

The Focke-Wulf Peterle was a design study for a turboprop-powered fighter-bomber, undertaken in Germany during World War II.

Development
It was based on the work previously done on Focke-Wulf Flitzer. The Peterle, known in Focke-Wulf documents as Einmotoriges Jagdflugzeug mit PTL-Gerät 021 was for an aircraft very similar in shape. The performance was calculated to be much better, but the unswept tail surfaces were predicted to cause problems at high speed, and the project was abandoned.

Some sources refer to this design as the Fw 281, but this is a fictitious designation derived from project label Baubeschreibung Nr. 281 for the Einmotoriges Jagdflugzeug mit PTL-Gerät 021.

Specifications (as designed)

See also

References

 
 
 
 
 
 
 

Abandoned military aircraft projects of Germany
Project VIII
Single-engined pusher aircraft
Mid-wing aircraft
Twin-boom aircraft
Single-engined turboprop aircraft